Frida was a biweekly teens'  magazine published in Sweden. The magazine was in circulation between 1981 and 2022. Ove Jerselius was the founder of Frida which targeted teenaged girls. Its headquarters was in Stockholm.

See also
 List of magazines in Sweden

References

External links
 Official website

1981 establishments in Sweden
2022 disestablishments in Sweden
Biweekly magazines published in Sweden
Defunct magazines published in Sweden
Magazines established in 1981
Magazines disestablished in 2022
Magazines published in Stockholm
Swedish-language magazines
Teen magazines